Water Forest may refer to:

Water Forest (album), 2003 album by Japanese singer-songwriter Rurutia
Water Forest (Xinghua), park in Xinghua, Jiangsu, China
Water Forest Press Publishing, book publisher in Pennsylvania, the United States